The 2022 Rafael Nadal tennis season officially began on 3 January 2022, with the start of the ATP 250 tournament in Melbourne. It includes Nadal's best start to an ATP Tour season, when he won his first 20 matches (and three titles, including the Australian Open) in a row. It was also his career-first season winning the first two majors of the year, hence completing the Australian-French title double. As such, Nadal broke his tie with Roger Federer and Novak Djokovic, and became the first man in history to win a total 21 (after winning the 2022 Australian Open), and 22 (after winning the 2022 French Open) Grand Slam singles titles.

Yearly summary

Early hard court season

Melbourne Summer Set 1

Rafael Nadal won his 89th ATP singles title at Melbourne Summer Set 1 without dropping a set en route, defeating qualifier Maxime Cressy in the final.

Australian Open

Nadal won his second Australian Open title and 21st men's singles major title overall, surpassing an all-time record he jointly held with Novak Djokovic and Roger Federer. Nadal defeated Denis Shapovalov and Matteo Berrettini en route to the final, where he outlasted Daniil Medvedev in five hours and 24 minutes. Nadal was down two sets, and serving at 2-3 0-40 in the third, eventually winning 2-6 6-7 (5-7) 6-4 6-4 7-5. It was Nadal's 90th ATP title, and he became the second man in the Open Era, after Djokovic, to achieve the double career Grand Slam.

Mexican Open

Nadal stormed to the title in high form, not dropping a set in any of his five matches (including a win over Medvedev, who earlier that week had clinched the world No. 1 ranking). He beat Cameron Norrie in the final to win his third title of the year and extend his unbeaten streak for the season to 15-0, his career-best start to an ATP Tour season.

Indian Wells Masters

Nadal reached the final for a fifth time after beating Sebastian Korda, Daniel Evans, Reilly Opelka, Nick Kyrgios and compatriot Carlos Alcaraz. He then lost in the final to Taylor Fritz, ending his 20 match winning streak, which marks his career-best start to a season.

Clay court season

Nadal missed the Monte Carlo Masters and the Barcelona Open citing a rib injury sustained in the Indian Wells final.  It was the first time in his career that he was forced to miss Monte Carlo and Barcelona where he has won 11 and 12 titles respectively.

Madrid Open

Nadal returned to play in Madrid. In his first match he beat Miomir Kecmanović, then saved 4 match points to beat David Goffin to reach the quarterfinals, where he was defeated by eventual champion Carlos Alcaraz in three sets.

Italian Open

Nadal returned to Rome as the defending champion, and defeated John Isner in straight sets in the second round. Nadal faced physical pain during his third round encounter with Denis Shapovalov due to his prevailing chronic foot injury, and lost in three sets.

French Open

Nadal won his 14th French Open title and a record-extending 22nd men's singles major title overall. He defeated four Top-10 players en route to the title; Félix Auger-Aliassime (fourth round), Novak Djokovic (quarterfinals), Alexander Zverev (semifinals), and Casper Ruud (final). Nadal completed the Australian–French double for the first time in his career, and became one of five men to do so in the Open Era. Nadal also became the oldest singles champion (36 years 2 days) in the history of the French Open.

Grass court season

Wimbledon

After treating his foot injury, Nadal returned to Wimbledon for the first time in three years. However, he tore an abdominal muscle during the tournament, which was aggravated after his quarterfinal match against Taylor Fritz. Despite winning the encounter, Nadal withdrew from the tournament the following day.

North American hard court season

Cincinnati Masters

Nadal returned to the Cincinnati Masters in his first match since facing an abdominal muscle tear at Wimbledon, however lost to the eventual-champion Borna Ćorić in the opening round.

US Open

Nadal returned to the US Open after not playing for 3 years and had his first hard court match since Cincinnati. He beat Rinky Hijikata in the first round, Fabio Fognini in the second round and Richard Gasquet in the third round. In the fourth round Nadal lost to Frances Tiafoe, ending his bid of a 3rd major in 2022.

Laver Cup

Nadal participated at the Laver Cup in London. He played just one doubles match, alongside longtime friend and rival Roger Federer in what was Federer's final professional tennis match. The pair lost to Jack Sock and Frances Tiafoe 11-9 in the final set tiebreak, despite holding a match point on Federer's serve. Team World went on to claim their first Laver Cup title.

Indoor Swing

Paris Masters

Nadal returned to the Paris Masters after not playing for 2 years, however lost to Tommy Paul in the opening round.

ATP Finals

On October 24th, Nadal confirmed his participation at the ATP Finals in Turin. He lost his opening matches to Taylor Fritz and Félix Auger-Aliassime in straight sets. He went on beat Casper Ruud, but he failed to advance to the semifinals.

All matches

This table chronicles all the matches of Rafael Nadal in 2022.

Singles matches

Doubles matches

Exhibition matches

Singles

Schedule
Per Rafael Nadal, this is his current 2022 schedule (subject to change).

Singles schedule

Yearly records

Head-to-head matchups
Rafael Nadal has a  ATP match win–loss record in the 2022 season. Bold indicates player was ranked top 10 at the time of at least one meeting. The following list is ordered by number of wins:

  Ričardas Berankis 2–0
  Daniil Medvedev 2–0
  Casper Ruud 2–0
  Botic van de Zandschulp 2–0
  Matteo Berrettini 1–0
  Francisco Cerúndolo  1–0
  Maxime Cressy  1–0
  Novak Djokovic 1–0 
  Dan Evans 1–0
  Richard Gasquet 1–0
  Marcos Giron 1–0
  David Goffin 1–0
  Fabio Fognini  1–0
  Yannick Hanfmann 1–0
  Rinky Hijikata 1–0
  John Isner 1–0
  Miomir Kecmanović 1–0 
  Karen Khachanov 1–0
  Sebastian Korda 1–0
  Stefan Kozlov 1–0
  Denis Kudla 1–0
  Nick Kyrgios 1–0
  Adrian Mannarino 1–0
  Corentin Moutet 1–0
  Cameron Norrie 1–0
  Reilly Opelka 1–0
  Emil Ruusuvuori 1–0
  Lorenzo Sonego 1–0
  Jordan Thompson 1–0
  Alexander Zverev 1–0
  Carlos Alcaraz 1–1
  Félix Auger-Aliassime 1–1
  Tommy Paul 1–1
  Denis Shapovalov 1–1
  Taylor Fritz 1–2
  Borna Ćorić 0–1
  Frances Tiafoe 0–1

* Statistics correct .

Top 10 wins

Finals

Singles: 5 (4 titles, 1 runner-up)

{|class="sortable wikitable"
!Result
!class="unsortable"|W–L
!Date
!Tournament
!Tier
!Surface
!Opponent
!class="unsortable"|Score
|-
| style="background:#98fb98;"|Win
| 1–0
| 
| Melbourne Summer Set, Australia*
| 250 Series
| style="background:#ccf;" | Hard
|  Maxime Cressy
|7–6(8–6), 6–3
|- style="background:#f3e6d7;"
| style="background:#98fb98;"|Win
| 2–0
| 
| Australian Open, Australia (2)
| Grand Slam
| style="background:#ccf;" | Hard
|  Daniil Medvedev
| 2–6, 6–7(5–7), 6–4, 6–4, 7–5
|-style="background:#d4f1c5;"
| bgcolor=#98fb98|Win
| 3–0
| 
| Mexican Open, Mexico* (4)
| 500 Series 
| style="background:#ccf;" | Hard
|  Cameron Norrie
| 6–4, 6–4
|-style="background:#e9e9e9;"
| bgcolor=ffa07a|Loss
| 3–1
| 
| Indian Wells Masters, USA
| Masters 1000
| style="background:#ccf;" | Hard
|  Taylor Fritz
| 3–6, 6–7(5–7)
|- style="background:#f3e6d7;"
| bgcolor=#98fb98|Win
| 4–1
| 
| French Open, France (14)
| Grand Slam
| style="background:#ebc2af;" | Clay
|  Casper Ruud
| 6–3, 6–3, 6–0

(*) signifies tournaments where Nadal won the title without dropping a set.

Earnings

Bold font denotes tournament win

 Figures in United States dollars (USD) unless noted. 
source：2022 Singles Activity
source：2022 Doubles Activity

Historic achievements

Personal bests
 Best match win streak at the start of a season (20)

See also

 2022 ATP Tour
 2022 Novak Djokovic tennis season
 2022 Daniil Medvedev tennis season
 2022 Carlos Alcaraz tennis season

Notes

References

External links 
  
 ATP tour profile

Rafael Nadal tennis seasons
Nadal
Nadal
2022 in Spanish sport